Asticcacaulis taihuensis is a bacterium from the genus of Asticcacaulis which has been isolated from sediments of the Taihu Lake in China.

References

External links
Type strain of Asticcacaulis taihuensis at BacDive -  the Bacterial Diversity Metadatabase

Caulobacterales
Bacteria described in 2005